Joaquín O. Giannuzzi (29 July 1924 – 26 January 2004) was an Argentine writer from Buenos Aires who focused on poetry and journalism.

20th-century Argentine poets
20th-century Argentine male writers
Argentine male poets
1924 births
2004 deaths
Argentine journalists
Male journalists
Writers from Buenos Aires
20th-century journalists